Sigurd Wongraven (born 28 November 1975), also known as Satyr, is a Norwegian musician who is the vocalist, guitarist, bassist and keyboardist for the black metal band Satyricon.

Musical career 
Wongraven was a founding member of Satyricon (although the band had been around for a short length of time as Eczema without him) and have so far released nine albums, two demos, and a live DVD. He has also contributed to other bands such as Darkthrone, Eibon, Storm, Thorns, Black Diamond Brigade and Wongraven. About black metal, he stated "It, black metal, doesn't necessarily have to be all satanic as long as it's dark."

In 2008 he began to endorse ESP Guitars.

Wine making 
In 2009 Wongraven started his own winemaking business, Wongraven Wines, in Piedmont in Italy. In 2014 the company began to work with Norwegian beverage conglomerate Vingruppen, and in 2019 he sold 90% of the company to Vingruppen, in a transaction valuing the company at NOK 57 million.

Health 
Wongraven was diagnosed with a brain tumor in October 2015, which he says does not need to be removed surgically, "as long as it does not grow bigger".

See also 
 List of celebrities who own wineries and vineyards

References

External links 
 Official Satyricon website

1975 births
Living people
21st-century Norwegian bass guitarists
Black metal singers
Heavy metal keyboardists
Norwegian heavy metal bass guitarists
Norwegian male bass guitarists
Norwegian black metal musicians
Norwegian heavy metal guitarists
Norwegian heavy metal singers
Norwegian male singers
Norwegian multi-instrumentalists
Norwegian rock bass guitarists
Norwegian rock guitarists
Norwegian rock keyboardists
Norwegian rock singers
Satyricon (band) members
Place of birth missing (living people)